Jaklovce is a village and municipality in the Gelnica District in the Košice Region of eastern Slovakia. The total population of the municipality was 1,885 in 2011.

See also
 List of municipalities and towns in Slovakia

References

Genealogical resources

The records for genealogical research are available at the state archive "Statny Archiv in Levoca, Slovakia"

 Roman Catholic church records (births/marriages/deaths): 1716-1920 (parish A)
 Greek Catholic church records (births/marriages/deaths): 1727-1896 (parish B)
 Lutheran church records (births/marriages/deaths): 1783-1896 (parish B)

External links
http://en.e-obce.sk/obec/jaklovce/jaklovce.html
Official homepage
Surnames of living people in Jaklovce

Villages and municipalities in Gelnica District